The Dormition of the Theotokos Cathedral is a Romanian Orthodox religious building in Satu Mare, Romania. Located on Dr. Vasile Lucaciu boulevard, it was originally built from the plans of the Romanian architect Gheorghe Liteanu, who was inspired by the Curtea de Argeş Cathedral. As the seat of an archpriest and not a bishop, it is a church and not technically a cathedral, but is commonly referred to as such.

The cornerstone was laid in October 1937, and the roof was finished by late 1938. The first liturgy was held in July 1940.

Notes

References
Daniela Bălu, Cristian Boloș, “Catedrala ortodoxă „Adormirea Maicii Domnului” — prima biserică ortodoxă construită în Satu Mare după Marea Unire”, in Satu Mare - Studii și Comunicări, nr. XXXIV/II, 2018, pp. 221-233

External links
 Description

Churches completed in 1938
20th-century Eastern Orthodox church buildings
Churches in Satu Mare
Romanian Orthodox churches in Romania
Historic monuments in Satu Mare County